Task Force 37 (TF 37) was a United States Navy task force active during World War II. Task Force numbers were in constant use, and there were several incarnations of TF 37 during World War II. The British Pacific Fleet was allocated as TF 37 in 1945.

References
Task Force 37

United States Navy task forces
Military units and formations of the United States Navy in World War II